The 43rd  New York Infantry Regiment was an infantry regiment of the Union Army during the American Civil War. The 43rd New York was mustered in on September 21, 1861, and mustered out June 27, 1865. It was recruited largely in the Albany and New York City areas, fought in many engagements and took heavy casualties.

Recruiting areas
The 43rd New York Infantry was recruited in the following areas:
A Company: Albany
B Company: Albany
C Company: Albany and Oneonta
D Company:Albany
E Company: Canajoharie
F Company: Hudson Falls
G Company: Schenectady
H Company: New York City
I Company: New York City
K Company: Cooperstown

Commanders
Colonel Francis L. Vinton
Colonel Benjamin F. Baker
Colonel Charles A. Milliken

Battle record
 Lee's Mill
 Williamsburg
 Seven Days Battles (After the Seven Days Battles, the regiment was consolidated into one battalion)
 Antietam
 Chancellorsville
 Deep Run
 Gettysburg
 Rappahannock Station
 Locust Grove
 Auburn
 Mine Run
 Wilderness
 Spotsylvania Courthouse
 Cedar Creek
 Cold Harbor
 Petersburg
 Sailor's Creek
 Appomattox

Casualties
The 43rd NY suffered 693 casualties:
117 officers and men killed or mortally wounded, 332 wounded and recovered, and 244 missing or captured.

See also
List of New York Civil War regiments

References

Infantry 043
Military units and formations established in 1861
Military units and formations disestablished in 1865
1861 establishments in New York (state)